Fedor Ivanovich Samokhin (12 February 1918 – 17 July 1992) was a Soviet prose writer, journalist, translator, member of the Union of writers of the USSR (since 1958). One of the representatives of "village" and "lieutenant" prose. The oldest Russian writer of Kyrgyzstan, whose works reflect the life of the people of the republic, its history and modernity. For his achievements in the field of fiction and for his active participation in the promotion and development of Kyrgyz Soviet literature, he was awarded three Honorary Diplomas of the Presidium of the Supreme Soviet of the Kirghiz SSR.

The author of a number of works of fiction about the Great Patriotic War, the most famous of which was the story "Cholponbai" about the feat of Hero of the Soviet Union Cholponbai Tuleberdiev, which was reprinted several times. The second edition of the story in the publishing house "Mektep" was digitized in 2019 by the Osh Regional Library named after Toktogul Satylganov, and in 2020 it was included in the section of materials from the Ministry of Education and Science of the Kyrgyz Republic.

Some of Samokhin's books are kept in the world's leading libraries, including the British Library and Harvard Library, as well as the Berlin State Library.

Biography 

The one of the oldest Russian writer of Kyrgyzstan, whose works have become an integral part of the literary process in the republic, front-line soldier Fedor Ivanovich Samokhin was born on the farm of Verkhne-Sadovsky of the Don Host Oblast of the Russian Soviet Republic in the family of a poor peasant. In 1940, he graduated from the Nizhne-Chirskaya secondary school. In 1944, he studied at the courses for newspaper workers in Moscow; in the same year he joined the ranks of the CPSU(b).

He began his career in 1934 as an accountant at his native collective farm, from 1940 to 1942 he worked as a senior accountant at the Nizhne-Chirskiy fish station. From 1942 to 1943 Fedor Ivanovich was a member of the Bureau of the Nizhne-Chirskiy Underground Komsomol District Committee, was a scout for a partisan detachment, and was seriously wounded. After the liberation of this region from occupation, he was appointed editor of the regional newspaper "Kolkhoznik Dona"; there were also published the first stories of Fedor Samokhin "Na perekate", "Garmon'", "Provody". 

From 1945 he was a correspondent for "Komsomolskaya Pravda", from 1946 – a literary worker, head of the department of the newspaper "Leninskaya smena" in the city of Alma-Ata, and from 1947 to 1949 – a special correspondent for the newspaper "Kommunist" (Jambyl Region). From 1949 he lived and worked in Frunze. 

From 1949 to 1961, he was a literary officer, head of a department in the editorial office of the newspaper "Komsomolets Kirghizii", from 1961 to 1963 – a literary employee in the editorial office of the journal "Bloknot agitatora".

He took up literary work in 1944. The first book of the writer was the story "Razvedchitsa Klavdiya Panchishkina", published in 1952 in Volgograd.

A special place among the works created by the writer was occupied by the story "Cholponbai", published for the first time in 1958 by the publishing house "Molodaya Gvardiya", dedicated to the immortal feat of the Hero of the Soviet Union Cholponbai Tuleberdiev; in the same year he was admitted to the Union of Writers of the USSR and received recognition in the literary society of Kyrgyzstan. Samokhin got acquainted with writers, poets and other cultural figures such as Aaly Tokombaev, Chingiz Aitmatov, Mikhail Sholokhov and others. 

Took part in the translation and publication of the collection of works by Kyrgyz front-line writers "Zveni, komuz!" (1985).

In 1992, after a long illness, Fedor Ivanovich Samokhin died in Bishkek.

Creative activity 

The beginning of his professional writing activity is considered 1949 and the beginning of work in the newspaper "Komsomolets Kirghizii". Fedor Samokhin did not have both legs and moved on prostheses, but he nevertheless often travelled a lot around the republic, got acquainted with interesting people – livestock breeders of Susamyr, builders of the Toktogul hydroelectric power station, oil workers from Izbaskent, cotton growers of Aravan, hydrologists of Orto-Tokoy and the fishermen of Issyk-Kul, the miners of Kyzyl-Kiya and the beet growers of the Kemin valley, who later became heroes of his works such as the stories "Dom moyego ottsa", "Tri ostrova", "Rodina, ya vernus'!" and "Chuiskiye razlivy".

The novel "Rodina, ya vernus'!" is dedicated to the dramatic struggle of the USSR for the return of Soviet children who remained in the territory occupied by the fascist forces and were taken into slavery. The main character of the story, a boy Esen Osmonov, who had been kidnapped and transferred to England by that time, was found and returned home by employees of the Soviet embassy in London.

The main theme of Fedor Ivanovich's creativity was the theme of the exploits of the Soviet people during the Great Patriotic War. His first literary work in this field was the story "Razvedchitsa Klavdiya Panchishkina" about a fighter of the partisan detachment of the Nizhne-Chirsky region. A special place in this series is occupied by the story "Cholponbai", which has gone through several reprints and received many reviews, including from literary critic and Corresponding Member of the National Academy of Sciences of the Kyrgyz Republic Tendik Askarov. 

The story was written for the 40th anniversary of the Komsomol and published by the Kyrgyz State Publishing House and an abridged version of the "Molodaya Gvardiya". When writing it, Fedor Samokhin visited the homeland of Cholponbai Tuleberdiev, traveled to the places of battles in which he took part, met in person, and got acquainted by correspondence with his friends and associates. 

In 2014, an excerpt from the story "Cholponbai" was included in the collection of documents and materials about Cholponbai Tuleberdiev, found in the Central State Archives of the Kyrgyz Republic, the Central State Archive of Political Documentation of the Kyrgyz Republic, Talas Regional State Archives, The Cholponbai Tuleberdiev Memorial Museum and in the Kara-Buurinsky united regional military registration and enlistment office, under the title "Podvig yego bessmerten...". In 2019, the story was digitized by the Osh Regional Library named after Togktogul Satylganov, and in 2020 it was included in the section with materials from the Ministry of Education and Science of the Kyrgyz Republic.

Fedor Samokhin was a regular author to the art and socio-political magazine "Literary Kyrgyzstan". Together with other writers (Sergei Fiksin, Nikolai Imshenetsky, Anatoly Bortsov, Viktor Shvemberger and others), who also chose Kyrgyzstan as their second homeland, he created the artistic world of Russian literature, which became an integral part of the spiritual world of the republic's ethnic Slavs.

Other works of the author on the theme of war were the stories "Malchik iz Stalingrada" and "Don — reka partizanskaya".

In the work of Fedor Ivanovich, essays also used the predominant direction. One of the works in this genre, entitled "Krov'yu serdtsa", was published in the collection of works by Soviet Kyrgyz writers "Geroyi surovykh let". The book also includes the works of Aaly Tokombayev, Chingiz Aitmatov, Sooronbai Zhusuev and other writers. The essay was also included in the collection entitled "Molodye geroyi Velikhoy Otechestvennoy voyny", compiled by Vasil Bykov. Also, the essay was included in the collection "In the name of the Motherland" by the Politizdat publishing house, compiled by the Soviet writer, journalist and Major General David Ortenberg.

A family 
In 1947 he was married to Samokhina (Koroneva) Raisa Ilinichna. The Samokhin family had three children – a daughter and two sons. Daughter Victoria died of a serious illness, son Vladimir died under tragic circumstances in 1969 in the Tien-Shan Mountain, the second son Aleksey lives in the Russian Far East.

Works 

Selected editions
 "Razvedchik Klavdiya Panchishkina" (Volgograd, 1952)
 "Malchik iz Stalingrada" ("Regional book publishing", 1954)
 "Cholponbai":
 "Cholponbai" ("Kyrgyz State Publishing House", 1958)
 "Cholponbai" ("Molodaya Gvardiya", 1958)
 "Cholponbai" ("Mektep", 1982)
 "Dom moyego ottsa" ("Kyrgyz State Publishing House", 1963)
 "Chuiskiye razlivy" ("Kyrgyzstan", 1968)
 "Rodina, ya vernus'!" ("Kyrgyzstan", 1975)

 Collections of stories and short stories
 "Izbrannoe" ("Kyrgyzstan", 1978)
 "Povesti i rasskazy" ("Kyrgyzstan", 1988)

Honours 
 Medal "For the Defence of Stalingrad"
 Jubilee Medal "In Commemoration of the 100th Anniversary of the Birth of Vladimir Ilyich Lenin"
 Jubilee Medal "Twenty Years of Victory in the Great Patriotic War 1941–1945"
 Badge "25 years of victory in the Great Patriotic War"
 Jubilee Medal "Thirty Years of Victory in the Great Patriotic War 1941–1945"
 Jubilee Medal "Forty Years of Victory in the Great Patriotic War 1941–1945"
 Jubilee Medal "50 Years of the Armed Forces of the USSR"
 Jubilee Medal "60 Years of the Armed Forces of the USSR"
 Three certificates of honor of the Presidium of the Supreme Soviet of the Kirghiz SSR.

References

Bibliography

External links 
Samokhin's books in the British Library

1918 births
1992 deaths
People from Don Host Oblast
Communist Party of the Soviet Union members
20th-century male writers
Soviet short story writers
20th-century Russian short story writers
Russian male novelists
Soviet novelists
Soviet male writers
Kyrgyzstani writers